Orianthi Penny Panagaris (born 22 January 1985), known mononymously as Orianthi, is an Australian guitarist, singer and songwriter who rehearsed in 2009 with Michael Jackson in preparation for his This Is It concert series, and performed with Alice Cooper's touring band. Her 2009 debut single "According to You" peaked at No. 3 in Japan, No. 8 in Australia and No. 17 in the US; her second album, Believe, received a worldwide release in late 2009. The same year, she was named one of the "12 Greatest Female Electric Guitarists" by Elle magazine. She also won the "2010 Breakthrough Guitarist of the Year" award hosted by Guitar International magazine.

Life and career

Early life
Orianthi Penny Panagaris was born in Adelaide, Australia to Greek parents. She began playing piano at the age of three, and at the encouragement of her father, moved to acoustic guitar at the age of six. When she was eleven, she took up electric guitar and left her school, Mercedes College, enrolling at Cabra Dominican College. She also attended St Peter's Collegiate Girls' School for a short period. At the age of 15, she turned her focus to writing songs and so began her professional career. She has been playing in bands since the age of 14 and performed in her first stage show for Steve Vai at the age of 15. Orianthi met and jammed with Carlos Santana when she was 18. He invited Orianthi to get up and jam with him at soundcheck then later asked if she would join him on stage that night to jam at his Adelaide concert, Memorial Drive on 30 March 2003.

Orianthi independently released her debut studio album, Violet Journey in 2005, composing all the material, contributing guitar, vocals, and drums on most cuts. She produced and mixed the final product at her home studio. Carlos Santana brought Orianthi to Paul Reed Smith's attention which led to her endorsement. Orianthi relocated to Los Angeles, signed with Geffen Records in late 2006 and struck a management deal with 19 Entertainment.

Orianthi has made a commercial for Panasonic, featured in the song "Now or Never" for Bratz: The Movie, played at the Eric Clapton Crossroads Guitar Festival, appeared in The New York Times business section promoting eco-friendly acoustic guitars, and opened for Steve Vai in the US.

Breakthrough

Orianthi appeared at the 51st annual Grammy Awards in February 2009 as Carrie Underwood's lead guitarist, with Underwood inviting Orianthi to become a member of her band. Following that performance (in addition to recommendations from industry professionals), Michael Jackson's management reached out to Orianthi for an audition for This Is It concerts. Orianthi was hence Michael Jackson's lead guitarist and was present at all rehearsals for his This Is It concerts before his death. In regard to being handpicked by Jackson, she stated:

 She played and sang at Jackson's memorial, globally televised live on 7 July 2009. She appears in the film Michael Jackson's This Is It, which chronicles the rehearsals for the tour and shows her and Jackson on stage. She presented an award at the 2009 American Music Awards, which Jackson won posthumously. Orianthi also appears on "We Are the World 25 for Haiti" – with the original co-written and partly performed by Jackson. She plays guitar on the song "Monster" by Michael Jackson featuring 50 Cent which was released on Michael on 14 December 2010.

Solo career 
Orianthi started working on her major label debut Believe in 2007, which was released in October 2009. The album produced the worldwide hit "According to You", which was the Single of the Week on iTunes on 27 October 2009, reached number 2 on US radio airplay and charted to number eight in Australia, three in Japan, and achieved platinum status in the US and Australia. The charismatic rock instrumental "Highly Strung" featuring Steve Vai became a popular YouTube video with millions of views and climbing, and her song "Suffocated" was featured on Guitar Hero: Warriors of Rock as a playable song.

Orianthi appeared on several late night shows; most notably, she appeared on American Idol results show, which aired on 26 March 2010. In 2010, she toured extensively, with headlining shows in the US, Japan, Australia, and Malaysia. She also opened for other artists including: John Mayer, Mika, Kid Rock, Daughtry and over 30 dates for Adam Lambert’s Glam Nation Tour with former Idol contestant Allison Iraheta. Orianthi performed at various music festivals and charity functions most notably at the Stand Up to Cancer telethon.

On 12 October 2011, the 5 track EP Fire, produced by Dave Stewart was released as an iTunes download. Five songs from the EP appeared on Orianthi's third studio album, Heaven in This Hell. The album was released on 12 March 2013.

In 2020 Orianthi signed an exclusive record deal with rock label Frontiers Records. "The album O was released on 6 November 2020, making it her first studio album in seven years. Marti Frederiksen produced the album and was preceded by the single "Sinners Hymn". Two other songs from the album, "Impulsive" and "Sorry", were released as singles and had music videos.

In January 2022 Orianthi announced that a live DVD and album would be released later in the year through Frontiers Records. In March she shared the title for her fifth album, Rock Candy. On 15 July 2022, Live from Hollywood was released on CD/DVD and Blu-ray. The performance was captured on 8 January 2022 at the Bourbon Room in Hollywood. Rock Candy was then released on 14 October.

Collaborations 
Orianthi has been very prolific in collaborating and being featured by many artists. She is featured on Iraheta's third single "Don't Waste the Pretty" and on Fefe Dobson's song "Can't Breathe" which appears on Fefe Dobson's album Joy released in November 2010. She has stated that the people she has collaborated with (i.e. Allison Iraheta and Lacey Mosley) are some of her best friends.

She recorded for the song "Sadda Haq" composed by Academy award-winning composer A. R. Rahman for a Bollywood 2011 film soundtrack Rockstar. The song became very popular and garnered substantial media coverage in India for Orianthi, being cited for her time as Michael Jackson's lead guitarist.

Orianthi joined supergroup Hollywood Vampires on the track "Whole Lotta Love" from the band's 2015 self-titled debut album.

In October 2016, Orianthi featured in The 2016 NRL Grand Final pre-game entertainment alongside Richie Sambora. Their performance was met with mixed reviews, and Sambora defended their performance the following day on Twitter.

On 29 September 2017, Orianthi and Richie Sambora released a five-song EP called Rise under the name RSO (an acronym of the two members' initials). They released another EP Making History on 15 December 2017, and their debut album Radio Free America was released on 11 May 2018. The band performed on the 5th episode of Season 11 of the PBS performance series Soundstage, which premiered on 3 May 2018.

Orianthi appears on the track Limelight from Don Felder's American Rock and Roll album, released in April 2019.

Touring guitarist 

On 29 August 2011, Orianthi was announced as Alice Cooper's new guitarist. She replaced Damon Johnson, who is now a member of Thin Lizzy. She was the first female member of the Alice Cooper band. Orianthi did two world tours with Alice Cooper, but resigned in June 2014, and was replaced by Nita Strauss. Her departure caused a rift between her and Strauss' respective fanbases, though the guitarists themselves are friends.

Orianthi has appeared as a guitarist for other stars including shows with Michael Bolton, Dave Stewart and James Durbin. She also appeared on the Top 7-week season 12 of American Idol on 3 April 2013 to play guitar for each of the performances. One month later Orianthi performed Fine China with Chris Brown at the 2013 Billboard Music Awards, and on 8 December of that same year she paid tribute to Carlos Santana, performing in the Kennedy Center Honors Gala.

She spent most of 2013–2015 touring with Dave Stewart, started BeMyBand, and released a song. In 2014, she joined Richie Sambora for his solo tour in Australia and Europe. In 2016, the two toured under the name RSO in Australia, South America and the UK.

Philanthropy
Orianthi met with Little Kids Rock students at the annual trade show for music merchants (NAMM) in 2010 after they opened for her. The kids gave her an acoustic guitar they autographed and she joined LKR's Honorary Board.

Discography

Solo career
 Violet Journey (2007)
 Believe (2009)
 Heaven in This Hell (2013)
 O (2020)
 Rock Candy (2022)

RSO
 Radio Free America (2018)

Filmography

Awards and nominations

Equipment

Guitars 
 PRS Custom 22
 PRS Custom 24
 PRS SE Custom 24
 PRS SE Singlecut
 Jackson KV2& KV5 (discontinued)
 Jackson DX10 (Discontinued)
 Ibanez RG Series (discontinued)
 Gibson Les Paul (early)
 Gibson SG (early)
 Garrison & Taylor Acoustics
 Duesenberg Starplayer TV, gift from Dave Stewart
 PRS SE Orianthi (her own signature SE model)
She also has a special private stock PRS Custom 24 guitar, nicknamed "MJ", made for the "This Is It" concerts. This one of a kind guitar is decorated with Swarovski crystals.

Amplifiers 
 Orange Amplification
 ENGL (This Is It)
 EVH 5150III
 Marshall
 Mesa Boogie

References

External links

Orianthi's page at 19 Entertainment
Orianthi Interview NAMM Oral History Library (2019)
2020 Interview – Australian Rock Show Podcast

1985 births
Living people
Australian people of Greek descent
Australian women guitarists
Australian rock guitarists
Australian rock singers
Alice Cooper (band) members
Geffen Records artists
Musicians from Adelaide
19 Recordings artists
Australian heavy metal guitarists
Lead guitarists
Australian expatriates in the United States
Orianthi
21st-century women guitarists
Women in metal